Carl Matthew Woszczynski (born April 18, 1988) is a retired American soccer player.

Playing career
Woszczynski attended Columbus North High School in Columbus, Indiana, where he was a four-year varsity starting goalkeeper. He recorded 42 career shutouts in 80 varsity starts. During his time there, he was a four-time All-Conference Indiana selection and three-time All State selection, as well as The Republic’s Area Player of the Year in 2006.

Woszczynski played club soccer with the Fort Wayne Fever, where he was an Indiana State Cup Champion in 2007. He also was a seven-time member of the Indiana State ODP Team, a two-time captain of that team, and was selected to the Region II pool twice.

College and amateur
Woszczynski played college soccer for the University of Alabama at Birmingham from 2007-2011, where he was recognized as one of the best goalkeepers to come through Conference USA. He holds the record for the best single-season goals-against-average in school history. He was also named Conference USA Defensive Player of the Week eight times in his career, which is the most in Conference USA and University of Alabama at Birmingham history. Woszczynski was a three-time All-Conference USA honoree. His senior year, he was named to both the College Soccer News National Team of the Week and Soccer America National Team of the Week on separate occasions. Woszczynski was also selected as a candidate for the Lowe’s Senior CLASS Award, and an NSCAA 3rd Team Academic All-American in 2011.

During his collegiate career, Woszczynski played four seasons in the USL Premier Development League, including two with the Indiana Invaders, and two with the Atlanta Blackhawks. He began the 2012 season with the Atlanta Silverbacks Reserves and played in four games.

Professional
Woszczynski was drafted in the first round (53rd overall) in the 2012 MLS Supplemental Draft by the Chicago Fire of Major League Soccer. He was the 3rd overall goalkeeper drafted. After spending the 2012 preseason with the Fire, he was released without a contract offer. Woszczynski then spent time during the season with the Columbus Crew filling in for an injured goalkeeper.

From there, Woszczynski signed with the Los Angeles Blues of the USL Professional Division. He made his debut on July 14, 2012 against Antigua Barracuda, where he earned the 2-0 win. He was subsequently named USL Honorable Mention Team of the Week for his performance in goal.

Woszczynski signed with Orlando City on November 4, 2013. He was released upon the conclusion of the 2014 season, a casualty of the club's transition to Major League Soccer. On November 19, Woszczynski signed with Arizona United SC. In the 2015 season, he led Arizona United in minutes played while captaining the team. He also set the USL single season record for saves in a season (130).

References

External links
 UAB profile

1988 births
Living people
American soccer players
UAB Blazers men's soccer players
Indiana Invaders players
Atlanta Blackhawks players
Orange County SC players
Orlando City SC (2010–2014) players
People from Columbus, Indiana
Phoenix Rising FC players
Soccer players from Indiana
Chicago Fire FC draft picks
USL League Two players
USL Championship players
Association football goalkeepers